River's Island (Japanese: リヴァース・アイランド) is the second album by Kiyotaka Sugiyama & Omega Tribe, released by VAP on March 21, 1984. The album includes two singles, "Asphalt Lady" and "Kimi no Heart wa Marine Blue," which peaked at #36 and #12 on the Oricon charts, respectively. The album itself peaked at #3.

Background 

In the previous album, Aqua City, the songs centered around summer and the sea, but in this work, there many songs were set in the city. "River's Island" is the title of Manhattan Island, New York City. The lyrics card of the record is made like a guide that introduces local plays, orchestras, and music facilities. However, all the production, including recording, was done in Japan. The sound also changed to adult with black contemporary in mind.

The previous single , "Kimi no Heart wa Marine Blue," was a long hit, and recorded almost double the sales of the previous single, "Asphalt Lady." The album was ranked 23rd on the 1984 Annual Album Chart.

Track listing

Personnel 

Producer: Koichi Fujita 
Executive Producers: Katsuhiko Endo, Atsushi Kitamura 
Directors: Shigeru Matsuhashi, Ken. Σ 
Sound Advisor: Tetusji Hayashi 
Recording Engineers: Kunihiko Shimizu, Jun Wakao 
Second Engineers: Yoshiaki Matsuoka 
Musician Coordinator: Akira Kawashima 
Artist Management: Triangle Production 
Photography: Cerard Champlong (Front cover), Takatsugu Kitagawa (Back cover and inner photo), Tadayasu Ozawa (artists) 
Design: Isao Sakai, Kanoko Showji

Charts

References 

1984 albums
Omega Tribe (Japanese band) albums